The Mercedes-Benz CL-Class is a line of grand tourers which was produced by German automaker Mercedes-Benz, produced from 1992 to 2014. The name CL stands for the German Coupé Leicht (Coupé-Light) or Coupé Luxusklasse (Coupé-Luxury). It is considered by Mercedes as their premier model.

In 2015 Mercedes officially ceased using the CL-Class designation, returning the vehicle's name back to the S-Class Coupe/Convertible, replacing it with the C217 S-Class Coupé.

History 

The CL-Class is the coupé derivative of the S-Class full-size luxury saloon, upon which it shares the same platform. Formerly known as the SEC (Sonderklasse-Einspritzmotor-Coupé) and later S-Coupé, it was spun off into its own, separate name in 1996 and in 1997 for North American markets. The CL continued to follow the same development cycle as the S, though riding on a shorter wheelbase, and sharing the same engines albeit with less choice as only the higher-output powertrains are offered. The last generation of the CL was actually heavier than its corresponding S trim (considering equivalent equipment), due to the roof engineering required to compensate for the lack of a central B-pillar.

First generation (C140; 1992–1998) 

The first generation CL-Class was the sleek but hard-lined and redesigned W140-chassis (internally known as C140) coupé of 1992–1999. Designed by Bruno Sacco, the C140's final design was approved between late 1987 and early 1988. Though the coupé's physical appearance changed little over these years, the class underwent a name change several times. The V8 and V12 coupés were called the 500 SEC and 600 SEC, respectively, in 1992 and 1993. The 600 SEC was the first V12 coupé ever offered by Mercedes-Benz. For 1994, the model names were changed to the S500 Coupé and the S600 Coupé. The name CL-Class was adopted in June 1996 (1997 for MY1998 North American models), and the W140 coupés were called the CL500 and CL600. Production ended in August 1998.

The M119 5.0 L V8 engine was regarded as one of the best engines ever produced by the German manufacturer (according to various journalists from automobile magazines such as Car and Auto Motor Und Sport). Being much lighter at the front, the CL500 tended to have better handling characteristics than the heavier V12 flagship.

Twelve cylinder variants are easily identified by the "V12" emblems at the base of each C pillar, placed immediately behind the passenger windows.  An entry level model, the CL420, was available with a 4.2 L V8 engine (with the same architecture as the M119 5.0 L V8 engine) and since it was not available at all markets, it had very low sales compared to its larger-engined siblings. Production ended September 1998 with 26,022 Coupés produced.

Engines 
Specifications for European model.

* All are electronically limited

Second generation (C215; 1999–2006) 

The second generation of the CL is the W215-chassis coupé of 1999–2006. It is based on the Mercedes-Benz S-Class (W220) (which was launched in late 1998 in Europe), though it rides on an  shorter wheelbase. The CL's front fascia of four oval headlights is similar to that of the W210 and W211 E-Class. The CL is offered as four models: the V8-powered CL 500, the NA V8-Powered CL55 AMG, the supercharged V8-powered CL55 AMG, the NA V12-powered CL 600 (2000-2002), the limited production (about 200 per year worldwide), 5.5 litre V12 Bi-Turbo CL600 (2003-2006), the very rare limited-edition NA CL63 AMG (26 examples only), the 2000 NA CL55 AMG F1 Edition (55 examples only), and the limited production (196 total) 6.0 litre V12 Bi-Turbo CL65 AMG (2004-2006). All models seat four. Development took place from 1993 to 1999, with final design being approved in 1996.

The CL coupés come equipped with the very latest in Mercedes-Benz technology, and along with the S-Class saloons the CL coupés receive new technological features (it introduced the refined Active Body Control fully active suspension system and Bi-Xenon HID lights). Active Body Control uses four hydraulic suspension rams that use three pressure regulators connected to a combination power steering and suspension pump, pushing fluid at a pressure of  through the system that, along with several intermediate computers and master CPU, keeps this car absolutely flat through the corners.
The CL class has a lengthy list of custom available features. The following features are standard: climate control, ABC (hydraulic) suspension, all-leather interior, designer wood trim, trip computer, CD, navigation system, front heated seats, power moonroof, as well as power door and trunk closing assist.  Optional features include a heated steering wheel and voice-activated telephone, as well as, front fan-cooled and heated seats.

The CL63 AMG is the rarest W215 CL of all. It was produced only in November 2001 and just 26 examples were sold. The engine produces 438 bhp and 390 lb-ft torque between 2,500 - 5,800 rpm, with a peak of 457 at 4,400 rpm. with some UK being and one for France registered in March 2002. The V12-powered CL63 AMG was only sold in Europe and Asia. Mercedes-Benz never offered the W215 CL63 for sale; all were sold exclusively through AMG.

The 2000 CL55 AMG F1 is also extremely rare with a total production of only 55 units. The engine was a naturally-aspirated 5.4-liter V8 delivering 354 bhp at 5,500 rpm, and 391 ft lbs torque at 4,100 rpm. This was the first road car to feature full Ceramic Brembo Vented and Cross Drilled Disc Brakes.

From 2000 through 2002, the V12-equipped cars featured a cylinder deactivation system called Active Cylinder Control. The feature was dropped when the  Bi-Turbo V12 was introduced. This deactivation feature allowed the CL 600 to get better fuel economy than the comparable CL 500, especially on the highway where the six-cylinder operation could be effectively used. Basically this engine is two Mercedes six-cylinder series engines mated to a common crank with appropriate engine monitoring systems.

Exclusive “Designo” packages are also available. These packages add custom color metallic paint, custom color Nappa leather interior and exotic wood trims. They are available in three variants: Designo Cashmere, Designo Espresso and Designo Silver. Additional variants can be found on rarer models. There was even an optional granite trim that took the place of wood.

In 2003 the engine options changed. The CL 55 AMG became supercharged allowing the car to accelerate from 0-60 mph in 4.27 sec according to Motor Trend and the V12 CL 600 had 2 turbochargers added and a slight engine reduction, from 5980 cc to 5513 cc. Both cars produced  the distinction, again, was the ghost like quietness of the CL 600 as compared to rather noisy CL 55 AMG. The CL 600 was conservatively rated by Mercedes-Benz as not to take sales away from the AMG CL 55. A dyno tested stock CL 600 was closer to 540 hp. Car & Driver's acceleration test delivered a 0-60 time of 4.3 seconds. The more powerful CL 65 (2004-2006) produced . These numbers are the stock performance ratings for the AMG CL 65.

Engines 

* All are electronically limited

Third generation (C216; 2006–2014) 

After 6 years of development, the new model was officially unveiled at the end of June 2006 and was presented at the 2006 Paris Motor Show. Like its predecessors, the C216 has no B-pillar interrupting the sleek curve of the side windows. The W216 is offered in four models, each with its own engine and transmission, the 5.5L V8-powered CL 500 (available with 4MATIC all-wheel drive, which is standard in Canada and the USA), the high-performance 6.2L V8-powered CL 63 AMG (with optional performance package variant) and the ultra-luxury twin-turbo 5.5L V12-powered CL 600 and, lastly, the CL 65 AMG with a twin-turbo 6.0L V12 engine. The CL 500 is sold as the CL 550 in some markets (including the U.S.). The class is based on the chassis of the W221 S-Class, which shares the same powertrains, although there are V6 and hybrid engines for the S not available for the CL. The two-door coupé weighs , being heavier than the equivalent S saloon, and rides on a full-size 116.3-inch wheelbase (albeit 8.2 inches less than the long wheelbase S-Class, which is the only S-Class sold in the U.S.). Despite its large size, rear seat legroom is limited in keeping in the tradition of 2+2 luxury coupés, though CL has more rear passenger space than its rivals. The CL's trunk is as large as that of the Audi A8 flagship saloon.

The C216 makes use of the Distronic Plus cruise control, which debuted on the 2007 S-Class.  This system is able to bring the car to a complete stop, and accelerate again to the pre-set speed, to keep a pre-set distance away from the car ahead of it. This Mercedes-Benz CL has also debuted with the new Active NightVision program that enables drivers to view the conditions in front of the car despite the dark surroundings.

In 2007, 40 C216 CL 65 AMG units have been sold as 40th Anniversary Edition, to celebrate AMG's founding 40 years earlier. Performance wise, the '40th Anniversary Edition' was a custom CL 65 AMG. Changes to the car included a 'ONE OUT OF 40' badge near the COMAND controller, special upholstery and rooflining, and a special 'AMG Alubeam' paint finish. Apart from the CL 65 AMG 40th Anniversary Edition, only a small selection of showcars got an Alubeam finish, a special paint designed to gleam like liquid metal.

2010 update 

The facelift version of the Mercedes CL-Class made its world debut in July 2010 at the Goodwood Festival of Speed. The new CL-Class comes with an improved exterior and interior, but the biggest changes are found under the hood. The exterior gets a new grille, bi-xenon headlights with LED technology, LED fog lamps, revised fenders and hood, and new exhaust pipes. For the interior the biggest change is the addition of a new wood trim. The new CL-Class will also be offered with all the latest technologies including: Active Blind Spot Assist, Attention Assist, Active Lane Keeping Assist, Night View Assist Plus, and Active Body Control.

It sprints from 0 to 60 mph in 4.0 seconds. Both vehicles are limited to 250 km/h.

The last generation of the CL-Class, C216, was available in five models: CL 500 (CL 550 in some markets, with standard 4MATIC in Canada and the USA), CL 600, CL 63 AMG, CL 63 AMG (S) and CL 65 AMG. The CL 65 AMG was the most powerful model of the CL and the most expensive Mercedes-branded vehicle, slightly edging out its S-Class equivalent S 65 AMG and the SLS. CL sales are the third-lowest of Mercedes-Benz in North America with under 1400 units sold in 2006, as only the G-Class four-wheel drive and two-seat SLS AMG sell smaller numbers; annual CL sales equalled Ford truck sales for one day. However, this degree of distinction was considered attractive to CL buyers.

Sales

See also 

Bentley Continental GT
Lexus LC

References

Notes

Bibliography

General

Workshop manuals

External links 

Official Mercedes-Benz CL-Class UK Page
Mercedes CL Class Overview
 Official Mercedes-Benz Website

CL-Class
Grand tourers
Personal luxury cars
Rear-wheel-drive vehicles
2000s cars
2010s cars
Cars introduced in 1996